Špiro Grubišić (2 January 1904 – 26 December 1985) was a Croatian rower. He competed in the men's eight event at the 1936 Summer Olympics.

References

External links 
 

1904 births
1985 deaths
Croatian male rowers
Olympic rowers of Yugoslavia
Rowers at the 1936 Summer Olympics
Sportspeople from Šibenik